Jean-Augustin Barral (31 January 1819 – 10 September 1884) was a French agronomist and balloonist.

Barral was born in Metz (Moselle). He studied at a polytechnic school and became a physicist as well as a professor of chemistry and agronomy. He wrote many works of popular science, especially concerning agriculture and irrigation, and became director of publication of scientific works. He was named perpetual secretary of the National Agricultural Society of France. He died in Fontenay-sous-Bois in 1884.

His name was included as one of the 72 names on the Eiffel Tower. He was a friend of Jacques Alexandre Bixio.

Partial list of publications 
L’Agriculture, les prairies et les irrigations de la Haute-Vienne, Imprimerie nationale, 1884
Les Irrigations dans le département de Vaucluse : rapport sur le concours ouvert en 1877 pour le meilleur emploi des eaux d'irrigation, Imprimerie nationale, 1878
Les Irrigations dans le département des Bouches-du-Rhône : rapport sur le concours ouvert en 1875 pour le meilleur emploi des eaux d'irrigation, Imprimerie nationale, 1876
Avenir de grandes exploitations agricoles établis sur les côtes du Vénézuéla, 1881

19th-century French chemists
1819 births
1884 deaths
French agronomists
French balloonists
Scientists from Metz
École Polytechnique alumni
19th-century agronomists